The Scarlet Horseman is a 1946 American Western film serial from Universal Pictures. It is directed by Lewis D. Collins and Ray Taylor. Paul Guilfoyle plays Jim Bannion, secret identity of The Scarlet Horseman, with Janet Shaw as Elise, his love interest. Virginia Christine plays the villainess, Matosca.

Plot
Two Texas Rangers investigate the kidnapping of wives and daughters of Senators. In order to do so, one goes undercover as "The Scarlet Horseman", a legendary and respected Comanche figure. The villainess, Matosca, intends to use the kidnappees to force a partition of Texas.

Cast
 Peter Cookson as Kirk Norris, a Texas Ranger
 Paul Guilfoyle as Jim Bannion, a Texas Ranger secretly using the identity of The Scarlet Horseman
 Janet Shaw as Elise Halliday, heroine
 Virginia Christine as Carla Marquette, daughter of a discredited Senator and secretly the villainous Matosca
 Victoria Horne as Loma
 Cy Kendall as Amigo Mañana
 Edward Howard as Zero Quick 
 Harold Goodman as Idaho Jones
 Danny Morton as Ballou, saloon owner 
 Helen Bennett as Mrs. Ruth Halliday 
 Jack Ingram as Tragg, one of Matosca's henchmen
 Edmund Cobb as Kyle, one of Matosca's henchmen
 Guy Wilkerson as Panhandle, one of Matosca's henchmen
 Al Woods as Senator Mark Halliday
 Fred Coby as Tioga
 Ralph Lewis as Saloon Henchman

Chapter titles
 Scarlet for a Champion
 Dry Grass Danger
 Railroad Rescue
 Staked Plains Stampede
 Death Shifts Passengers
 Stop that Stage
 Blunderbuss Broadside
 Scarlet Doublecross
 Doom Beyond the Door
 The Edge of Danger
 Comanche Avalanche
 Staked Plains Massacre
 Scarlet Showdown
Source:
The opening narration to each chapter was by Milburn ("Gunsmoke") Stone.

See also
 List of film serials
 List of film serials by studio

References

External links

1946 films
American black-and-white films
1940s English-language films
Universal Pictures film serials
Films directed by Ray Taylor
Films directed by Lewis D. Collins
1946 Western (genre) films
American Western (genre) films
1940s American films